Robin Henderson Thompson (5 May 1931 – 14 August 2003) was a rugby union international for Ireland, a former British Lions captain and rugby league player.

Robin Thompson won two Ulster Schools Senior Cup medals with RBAI (Royal Belfast Academical Institution) and played for Ulster Schools. He made the Queen's University RFC senior side in his first year in the university and while still only 18, he made his Ulster début.

He won his first international cap in the second row as a 20-year-old against France in Paris in December 1951. He was also on the team that defeated France in Paris in January 1952. He played throughout the championship and against New Zealand in 1953-54 and the following season captained Ireland against both France and Wales. He was capped 11 times. He won the Ulster Senior League with Queen's University, the Ulster Senior Cup with Instonians, and also played for London Irish, and the Barbarians.

He was made captain of the 1955 British Lions tour to South Africa. He played in three of the four tests on that tour.

Following the tour he turned professional and played rugby league for Warrington (Heritage No. 567). But an injury and subsequent medical advice brought an end to his playing career while still only 25. After returning to Ireland, he subsequently became a media analyst.

External links
Lions skipper Thompson dies

1931 births
2003 deaths
Alumni of Queen's University Belfast
Barbarian F.C. players
British & Irish Lions rugby union players from Ireland
Expatriate rugby league players in England
Footballers who switched code
Instonians rugby union players
Ireland international rugby union players
Irish expatriate rugby league players
Irish expatriate sportspeople in England
Irish rugby league players
Irish rugby union players
London Irish players
Middlesex County RFU players
Queen's University RFC players
Rugby league players from County Down
Rugby union locks
Ulster Rugby players
Warrington Wolves players